Tenacious may refer to:

Ships 
HMS Tenacious (R45), a 1943 Royal Navy destroyer
, an R-class destroyer (1916)
RSS Tenacious (71), a Formidable-class frigate of the Republic of Singapore Navy
USNS Tenacious (T-AGOS-17), a United States Navy Ocean Surveillance Ship
SV Tenacious, a 2000 British sail training ship
Tenacious (yacht), a racing yacht owned and skippered by Ted Turner and winner of the 1979 Fastnet Race

Other uses 
Tenacious (horse), an American Thoroughbred racehorse
Tenacious Records, a record label founded by percussionist Alphonse Mouzon

See also
Tenacious D, an American band started by Jack Black and Kyle Gass
Tenacity (disambiguation)